The 2019 Audi Cup was the sixth edition of the Audi Cup, a two-day association football tournament that featured four teams and was played at the Allianz Arena in Munich, Germany. The competition featured the hosts Bayern Munich, Spanish side Real Madrid, English side Tottenham Hotspur, and Turkish side Fenerbahçe. 

This was Tottenham's second participation in the tournament since 2015.

The competition was won by Tottenham Hotspur, who defeated hosts Bayern Munich in the final 6–5 on penalties after a 2–2 draw.

Venue

Competition format
The competition had the format of a regular knockout competition. The winners of each of the two matches on the first day competed against each other for the Audi Cup, while the two losing sides played in a third-place match. The trophy was contested over two days, with each day seeing two matches played back-to-back.

Bracket

Matches

Semi-finals

Third place play-off

Final

Goalscorers
3 goals
  Karim Benzema (Real Madrid)
  Thomas Müller (Bayern Munich)
1 goal
  Fiete Arp (Bayern Munich)
  Kingsley Coman (Bayern Munich)
  Alphonso Davies (Bayern Munich)
  Nabil Dirar (Fenerbahçe)
  Christian Eriksen (Tottenham Hotspur)
  Leon Goretzka (Bayern Munich)
  Harry Kane (Tottenham Hotspur)
  Max Kruse (Fenerbahçe)
  Erik Lamela (Tottenham Hotspur)
  Mariano (Real Madrid)
  Nacho (Real Madrid)
  Garry Rodrigues (Fenerbahçe)
  Renato Sanches (Bayern Munich)
  Ozan Tufan (Fenerbahçe)

References

Audi Cup
Audi Cup
Audi Cup
International club association football competitions hosted by Germany